The World of Wonderful Reality is a 1924 British lost silent romance film directed by Henry Edwards and starring Edwards, Chrissie White, and James Lindsay. It was based on a story by E. Temple Thurston.

Cast
 Henry Edwards as John Gray 
 Chrissie White as Jill Dealtry 
 James Lindsay as Skipworth 
 Henry Vibart as Thomas Grey 
 Gwynne Herbert as Mrs. Grey 
 Stephen Ewart as Mr. Dealtry 
 Violet Elliott as Mrs. Dealtry

See also
List of lost films

References

External links

1924 films
British silent feature films
1920s romance films
Films directed by Henry Edwards
British black-and-white films
British romance films
Hepworth Pictures films
1920s English-language films
1920s British films